Box Hill is a suburb of Sydney, in the state of New South Wales, Australia. Box Hill is located 42 kilometres north-west of the Sydney central business district in the local government area of The Hills Shire and is part of the Hills District region.

In July 2020, a portion of Box Hill in the north was carved out and became the separate suburb of Gables. It also absorbed two small areas of Rouse Hill.

Heritage listings
Box Hill has a number of heritage-listed sites, including:
 10 Terry Road: Box Hill House
 Windsor Road: Box Hill Inn

Demographics
According to the 2016 census of population, there were 902 people in Box Hill. 79.1% of people were born in Australia and 75.5% of people spoke only English at home. The most common responses for religion in Box Hill were Catholic 42.8%, Anglican 18.3% and No Religion 13.2%.

References

Suburbs of Sydney
The Hills Shire